Marco Micaletto (born 19 January 1996) is an Italian footballer who plays as a midfielder for Columbus Crew 2 in MLS Next Pro.

Early life and career
Born in Italy, Micaletto grew up in England and attended Bradfield College. Micaletto moved to the United States to play NCAA Division II college soccer for the Young Harris Mountain Lions. He played 57 games and scored 21 goals for the team before graduating. After graduating, Micaletto transferred to play for the Akron Zips. He played one season for the Zips, making 24 appearances and scoring one goal for the team. During his college career helped his teams win a Division II Peach Belt Conference Championship and a Mid-American Conference Tournament Championship.

Micaletto played for three USL League Two teams, Charlotte Eagles, Reading United, and South Georgia Tormenta FC.

Professional career

Tormenta FC 
After one season with Tormenta FC, Micaletto turned professional with the club in their first season with USL League One. After three seasons with the club at a professional level, Micaletto made over 70 appearances and scored over 20 goals.

After four seasons with South Georgia Tormenta, Micaletto joined MLS Next Pro club Columbus Crew 2 for an undisclosed fee in February 2022.

Columbus Crew 2 
On February 25, 2022 it was announced that Micaletto had joined the Columbus Crew organization and Columbus Crew 2. He was named the first ever captain of the reserve side. Micaletto made his debut for the organization in a 2–0 loss for Crew 2 against Inter Miami CF II.

Professional statistics

References

External links
 
 
 Profile at Akron Athletics

1996 births
Living people
Italian footballers
English footballers
Italian expatriate footballers
English expatriate footballers
Italian expatriate sportspeople in the United States
Akron Zips men's soccer players
Association football midfielders
Charlotte Eagles players
Expatriate soccer players in the United States
Reading United A.C. players
Footballers from Rome
Tormenta FC players
USL League One players
USL League Two players
Young Harris Mountain Lions men's soccer players
English people of Italian descent
People educated at Bradfield College
Columbus Crew 2 players
MLS Next Pro players